Kangaroo Lake may refer to:

 Kangaroo Lake (California)
 Kangaroo Lake (Wisconsin)
 Kangaroo Lake (New Zealand)